Lucky Jim is a novel by Kingsley Amis.

Lucky Jim may also refer to :

Films
 Lucky Jim (1909 film), an unrelated film
 Lucky Jim (1957 film), an adaptation of the novel
 Lucky Jim (2003 film), an adaptation of the novel

People
Jim Pollock (rugby union) (born 1958), Scottish Rugby player
James F. Gusella (born 1952), Canadian scientist
James Barnor (born 1929), Ghanaian photographer
Lucky Jim Elliott, drummer for Australian band, The Cruel Sea
"Lucky Jim", a self-depicted cartoon racing tipster drawn by Clive Collins (1942–2022)

Fictional characters
James "Lucky Jim" Howlett, altar ego of Wolverine in the Marvel Universe
Lucky Jim, a fictional character from the Simpsons episode "Sex, Pies and Idiot Scrapes"
"Lucky Jim" Morrison, a fictional character from 1955 film The Fighting Chance played by Howard Wendell

Other
 Lucky Jim (album), a 1993 album by the Gun Club
 Lucky Jim, a Breeders Crown-winning horse trained by Julie Miller

See also
Lucky Jim Camp